In Australian corporations law, proper authority is the authorisation provided by a licensed securities dealer to an individual that permits the holder to represent the securities dealer.

See also
 Registered representative (securities), in the United States

References
02/162 Barton Capital Securities provides enforceable undertaking, ASIC

Securities (finance)
Australian corporate law